Bob McRoberts (April 28, 1924 – March 9, 2012) was a former halfback in the National Football League. He was a member of the Boston Yanks during the 1944 NFL season.

References

1924 births
2012 deaths
American football halfbacks
Boston Yanks players
Wisconsin–Stout Blue Devils football players
Players of American football from Wisconsin
People from St. Croix County, Wisconsin